Hereford Football Club is an English association football club from the city of Hereford. They were founded in 2014 as a phoenix club for Hereford United, and inherited their Edgar Street stadium. They are nicknamed 'The Whites' after their predominantly white kit, or 'The Bulls' after the Hereford cattle breed, and their motto is 'Our greatest glory lies not in never having fallen, but in rising when we fall'. The club is affiliated to the Herefordshire County Football Association.

As of the 2022–23 season, the club plays in the National League North, at the sixth tier of the English football league system. They entered the football pyramid before the 2015–16 season and won three league titles in their first three campaigns - the Midland Football League Premier Division followed by the Southern League South & West and the Southern League Premier.

History

Foundation
Following the winding up of Hereford United on 19 December 2014, the Hereford United Supporters Trust (HUST) vowed to start a new phoenix club. Three days later, local businessman Jon Hale, who had earlier been chairman of HUST, registered the name Hereford Football Club with the Herefordshire County Football Association, in conjunction with the trust and a group of local businessmen. A press release followed on 24 December, outlining plans to let HUST members decide on the club's kits and crest. It also addressed the issue of the ownership structure, with the Hereford United Supporters Trust being given the opportunity to become the largest single shareholder, with individuals and corporate benefactors being barred from owning more than 49% of the new club. The press release stated that HUST's stake would be 'much more' than this.

The club's official website went live on 29 December. Hale gave an interview with Trevor Owens on BBC Hereford and Worcester on 3 January 2015, citing Hereford United's untenable debts as the reason for the business group's reluctance to engage with the former club. The appointment of Hale as Hereford F.C. chairman was released in an FAQ on 13 January. An open meeting two days later confirmed several appointments, including HUST chairman Chris Williams as vice chairman, Hugh Brooks as finance director, George Webb as commercial director and Phil Eynon as governance director (the latter three being part of the Hale-led group of local businessmen).

On 20 and 21 January, HUST members voted in favour of the proposal from the Hale group, with 96.71% voting to accept the plans. The Hereford F.C. bid had been the only approach submitted to HUST. Two weeks later, Herefordshire Council confirmed that the club had secured a five-year lease for the city's Edgar Street stadium.

The club opened applications for the position of club manager on 27 February and, following 42 applications, Peter Beadle was announced as the successful candidate by the board on 17 April 2015. Beadle, the final caretaker manager of the predecessor club, was joined by assistant manager Matt Bishop, who had served as a national coach developer with The Football Association.

2015–16 season
On 14 May 2015, the FA confirmed that Hereford would compete in the Midland Football League Premier Division (9th tier) for the club's first season. As a consequence, this meant that the club were entered into the FA Vase and the Midland League Cup.

The first game, a pre-season friendly, took place away at Malvern Town on 7 July 2015, a 3–2 victory for Hereford in which the winning goal was scored by Dale Hodge, in front of a record crowd for the hosts. Four days later, Hereford hosted their first match, a friendly against FC United of Manchester at Edgar Street, with Nathan Hughes scoring the only goal in a victory watched by around 4,250 spectators. They won 4–1 against Dunkirk in their first league match on 8 August, in front of a crowd of 4,062; this broke the league record attendance of 1,280, and was higher than four attendances that day in Football League One.

On 10 December 2015, while in first place in the league, the club announced that they had applied for promotion to the Southern Football League for the 2016–17 season.
The league campaign had started with a shaky start, but they managed to put together a long winning run, which eventually came to an end after 27 wins in a row, in a 1–1 draw at home to Alvechurch on 23 January 2016, and the unbeaten run of 34 games came to an end on 23 February, following a 2–0 loss at home to Highgate United.

Hereford broke their attendance record again in the FA Vase semi-final first leg against Salisbury on 12 March. Hereford won 1–0 in front of a record crowd of 4,683. On 25 April, Hereford clinched the league title following a 4–0 away win at Coventry Sphinx and were subsequently promoted to the Southern League South and West Division. A week later, the club picked up their second trophy, the Herefordshire County Cup, following a 5–1 win over Westfields.
Hereford secured their third trophy of the season, the Midland Football League Cup, on 10 May, following a 3–1 win over Walsall Wood at Solihull Moors' Damson Park.
On 22 May, Hereford lost 4–1 in the FA Vase Final to Morpeth Town at Wembley Stadium.

2016–17 season

On 12 May 2016, it was confirmed that Hereford would compete in the Southern League South and West, following their promotion from the Midland Football League Premier. The season saw the club make their first appearance in both the FA Cup and the FA Trophy. It was announced on 24 May, that assistant manager Matt Bishop would be leaving the club, and he was replaced by Steve Jenkins on 30 May. The club decided to withdraw from the Southern League Cup in an attempt to focus on the league. The club went out of the FA Cup at the third qualifying round at Tonbridge Angels and exited the FA Trophy in the preliminary round at Salisbury. On 12 October, the club announced that manager Peter Beadle had signed his first contract with the club, on a rolling 12-month deal. On 19 October, it was announced that Chairman Jon Hale had stepped down and was to be replaced in the interim by Chris Williams, who was replaced by Ken Kinnersley on 3 January 2017.

On 4 March 2017, their away match against Didcot Town was abandoned due to crowd disturbances after a few Hereford fans went on to the pitch in celebration of the team taking the lead in the dying minutes of the game. Two men from Hereford were later arrested. After reviewing reports and video footage of the incidents, the FA decided to take no further action against either club, rather highlighting how sensationalised and ill-informed some of the news reporting, at the time, had been. Disciplinary action, however, was taken against three Hereford supporters, one of the Didcot players and the Didcot team coach. The Southern League also ordered the game to be replayed – which was subsequently played behind closed doors on 11 April 2017, with Hereford winning 2–1.

2017–18 season

Following their promotion in the previous season, it was announced Hereford would play in the Southern League. It was also announced that captain Joel Edwards with Jimmy Oates taking over his role.

Hereford notably had runs in the FA Cup and FA Trophy. In the FA Cup, Hereford after beating Godalming Town, Kempston Rovers and A.F.C. Hornchurch, Hereford were drawn a game away to Eastleigh where goals from Mike McGrath and Garyn Preen (who was unable to finish the match) took Hereford into the first round for the first time in their history. In the first round, a John Mills goal progressed the Bulls past AFC Telford United and into the second round, where they were drawn against Fleetwood Town. Hereford earned themselves a replay at Edgar Street. The Bulls lost 2-0 in front of an attendance of 4,235 and the BT Sport Cameras. In the FA Trophy, Hereford beat Weymouth, Potters Bar Town and Oxford City to reach the first round. A 3-2 win over National League side Dagenham & Redbridge 3–2 set up a tie against Wealdstone. A moment of controversy marked a turning point in the Second Round match, when defender Dara O'Shea seemed to bring down a player which resulted in him getting sent off. Footage later on showed O'Shea should not have been given a red card so the FA reversed the decision. Hereford ended up losing that game 1–0.

On the domestic side, in January, Hereford came back from 2–0 down in injury time to salvage a 2–2 draw with promotion chasing Slough Town after goals from Jimmy Oates and Keyon Reffell, the latter coming 6 minutes into additional time. Hereford's away unbeaten run in the league came to an end in January 2018 due to defeat at the hands of King's Lynn. This unbeaten run stretched back to August 2015. In February 2018, Hereford fans were punished after multiple flares were thrown onto the pitch at Farnborough.  Farnborough player Lewis Ferrell then retaliated and threw the flare back at Hereford fans, which resulted in him being shown a straight red card. On Tuesday 17 April, Hereford travelled to Biggleswade Town where a 1–0 away victory saw them become league champions for a third consecutive season. They lifted the Southern Football League shield following a 4–1 win against Kettering Town and finished the season with a 6–0 home win over Hereford Lads Club to win the Herefordshire County Cup for a third successive time.

2018–19 season 
On 13 September 2018, after three league titles in a row, Peter Beadle was sacked as manager of Hereford, a month into the new season with Hereford in 12th place in the National League North. Assistant manager Steve Jenkins also departed, leaving Ryan Green as interim player-manager. On 19 September 2018, Tim Harris was appointed Head of Football, with Marc Richards subsequently taking the Head Coach role on 3 October 2018. They finished the season in 17th after poor performances against teams in positions low-down in the table, including 0 wins from 6 against the three relegated sides.

2019–20 season
Three games into the campaign, and with four points from a possible nine, Marc Richards was sacked as head coach on 12 August, with his assistant Will Morford also leaving. The club announced that Head of Football Tim Harris would take interim charge of the side while searching for a new head coach. On 29 August, Russell Slade was announced as the club's new Manager. Andy Whing joined as his assistant on 13 September.

Hereford invested in a new digital scoreboard to improve commercial advertising opportunities in September 2019. Its first game in use on 8 October 2019  coincided with the club crashing out of the FA Cup at the 3rd Qualifying Round stage in a replay against Tamworth, losing 3–1 on penalties having drawn both 90-minute games 0–0. This result was Russell Slade's first home defeat.

Tim Harris resigned as Head of Football on 27 November 2019, with the position of 'Head of Football' subsequently being dissolved.

On 14 January, Assistant Coach Andy Whing left the club with no reason being given for his departure. Just 6 days later on 20 January, Manager Russell Slade left the club after a run of just one win in 18 games. Josh Gowling was named the club's interim manager on 21 January, he appointed Steve Burr as his assistant 3 days later.

The season was eventually abandoned with seven games still to go due to the COVID-19 pandemic, with Hereford finishing in 16th place.

2020-21 season 
Due to the COVID-19 pandemic, the majority of the 2020-21 season was cancelled or played behind closed doors. However, the club enjoyed a relatively successful season, finishing in 12th position in the National League North. In cup competitions, they were knocked out of the FA Cup to Stafford in only their third competitive match. In the FA Trophy however, they managed to progress all the way to the 2021 Final, beating higher tier teams Aldershot in the quarter-final, and Woking in the semi-final. They eventually lost the match at Wembley Stadium to Hornchurch, despite going ahead through Tom Owen-Evans early in the match.

2021-22 season 
The club announced on the 8th of May 2021 that Manager Josh Gowling and assistant Steve Burr had agreed new deals with the club, lasting for 2 years. A 2-1 friendly loss to historically bitter rivals Shrewsbury Town marked the first Edgar Street match without social distancing regulations in place. Hereford started the 2021-22 season badly, finding themselves bottom of the table and winless after 6 games in all competitions. They picked up their first three points in a 1-0 win away at York City, in a match that included both a goal by Tom Owen-Evans and a penalty save from goalkeeper Brandon Hall. On 16th October, the club crashed out of the FA Cup, losing 0-1 to Solihull Moors at Edgar Street. Things were brighter for the Bulls in November, going unbeaten (excluding penalty kicks) in all competitions. A final day loss to champions Gateshead meant Hereford finished the season in 12th place, collecting 55 points across 15 wins and 10 draws.

2022-23 season 
After 1 point from their first two games, Hereford picked up their first win of the season on 16 August, thanks to a late Luke Haines goal as the Bulls defeated Chester 1-0. Wins over Bromsgrove Sporting, Three Bridges and Bromley progressed the Bulls into the FA Cup First Round, where they drew League One Portsmouth at home. It was later announced that the match would be live on BBC Two, making it only the fourth televised match since the club reformed. Despite taking a 1–0 lead in the first half, Hereford went on to lose the game 3–1 and were knocked out of the FA Cup. On 19 November 2022, Hereford were knocked out in the second round of the FA Trophy by Heybridge Swifts, a team two steps below them, losing 3–0 at the Aspen Waite Arena.

Season-by-season

Key

  = Promoted
  = Relegated

 PR = Preliminary round
 1Q = First qualifying round
 2Q = Second qualifying round
 3Q = Third qualifying round
 4Q = Fourth qualifying round
 1R = First round proper
 2R = Second round proper

 3R = Third round proper
 4R = Fourth round proper
 5R = Fifth round proper
 QF = Quarter-finals
 SF = Semi-finals
 RU = Runners-up
 W = Winners

Stadium 
Since reformation as the phoenix club, Hereford have played all their home matches at Edgar Street, the same as its predecessor. The name of the stadium directly derives from the name of the street where it is located, which is also the A49. The club agreed a lease with the council in February 2015, and won their first match at the ground 1-0 against FC United of Manchester, in front of a crowd of 4,257. 

The ground itself has changed little since the mid-1970s, largely outdated and in need of redevelopment, with the Blackfriars End failing a safety inspection in July 2009. The terraced end had fallen into a state of disrepair which steadily reduced the stadium capacity from nearly 9,000 to 7,700 by November 2007. Improvements were made in the later years of the predecessor, to ensure the ground met Football League standards, including new floodlights, dressing rooms and barriers on the terraces.

Hereford FC's record attendance for a home game at Edgar Street is 4,683, for a 1–0 win in the FA Vase semi-finals against Salisbury on 13 March 2016. It hosted televised FA Cup matches twice: a Second-Round Proper Replay against Fleetwood Town in December 2017, and a First-Round Proper match against Portsmouth in November 2022. The 2020–21 FA Trophy Semi-Final between Hereford FC and Woking was also played here, although it took place behind closed doors due to the COVID-19 pandemic. Hereford came out 1-0 winners, although failed to beat Hornchurch in the Final.

Crest and colours

Crest
It was announced on 1 March 2015, that 89% of the 900+ HUST members that voted, chose a badge designed by Huw Marriott and his sons Max and Louis.

Colours
On 5 May 2015, it was announced that the club had signed a two-year kit deal with Italian manufacturer Macron.
A vote was cast for the away colours, with a red and black striped kit being chosen by HUST members. On 25 March 2016, Hereford announced that their deal with Macron had been extended by 2 years, with a new home kit in 2016–17 alternating seasonally with the away kit. 
Prior to the 2020–21 Season, the club announced a new three-year deal with Adidas

Support

Hereford's fanzine is called Talking Bull.

During Hereford's inaugural season they averaged a league attendance of 2,836, a figure higher than six Football League Two sides.

Rivals 
Hereford maintain a strong rivalry with Shrewsbury Town, originating with the former Hereford United. It is known as the A49 derby, after the road separating the two towns, and was listed nineteenth in The Daily Telegraph's twenty fiercest rivalries in English football. However, since Hereford's resurrection the two sides have never met in a competitive fixture. 

The Bulls also maintain a strong rivalry with Kidderminster Harriers, since Hereford's promotion to the National League North. So far, the clubs share 4 wins each in Head-to-Heads. 

Whilst climbing up the English Football Pyramid, the Bulls also developed competitive rivalries against local clubs Westfields, Alvechurch and Gloucester City.

Players and staff

Current squad

Out on loan

Current management and staff

Managers

Honours
Southern Football League Premier Division
Winners (1): 2017–18
Southern Football League Division One South & West
Winners (1): 2016–17
 Southern Football League, Champions of Champions Trophy 2016/17 (1)
Midland Football League Premier Division
Winners (1): 2015–16
Herefordshire County Cup
Winners (3): 2015–16, 2016–17, 2017–18
Midland Football League Cup
Winners (1): 2015–16
FA Trophy
Runners-up: 2020–21
FA Vase
Runners-up: 2015–16

Notable players

A number of full internationals have played for Hereford during the club's history and have either been capped before, during or after their career with the club.

  Dara O'Shea
  Jahquil Hill
  Maziar Kouhyar
  Mustapha Bundu

  Raheem Hanley
  Reece Styche
  Rowan Liburd
  Ryan Green
  Samir Nabi
  Theo Wharton

Notes

References

External links

Official club website

 
Football clubs in England
Football clubs in Herefordshire
Hereford
Association football clubs established in 2014
2014 establishments in England
Phoenix clubs (association football)
Midland Football League
Southern Football League clubs
National League (English football) clubs